North Carolina Highway 704 (NC 704) is a primary state highway in the U.S. state of North Carolina.  The highway connects Madison with northern Stokes County and the Wentworth-Reidsville area.

Route description
NC 704 is a mostly two-lane rural highway that traverses .  Beginning at NC 89, near Francisco, east through Madison, to NC 65 near Wentworth. This highway connects the communities of Campbell, Coleville, Sandy Ridge, Delta, Prestonville and Pleasantville.

All of NC 704 is dedicated to Wesley D. Webster who was a state politician from Madison. The name was established by the General Assembly through a resolution approved on July 20, 1984.

History
Established in 1930 with its original primary routing from NC 708, near Madison (junction located where Ellisboro and Bald Hill Loop Roads once intersect), and US 170/NC 70, in Greensboro (junction located where Battleground Avenue, Elm Street and Summit Avenue all converged).  In 1932, US 411 was assigned along all of NC 704.  In 1933, NC 704 was extended northwest to NC 891, in Coleville; replacing a part of NC 708, a brief concurrency with US 311 and new primary routing west of Madison. Also in Greensboro, NC 704 was rerouted onto Wendover Avenue to Elm Street. In 1934, all of NC 704 was removed from US 411, which by end of year was replaced by US 220. In 1935, NC 704 was extended to its current eastern terminus at US 158 (today's NC 65), near Wentworth, replacing nearly all of NC 708. In 1936, NC 704 was extended to its current western terminus at NC 89, near Francisco; reclaiming former primary routing of NC 893 and later NC 661 in the 1920s, west of NC 109 (NC 891's successor, eventually becoming NC 8) in Coleville.

North Carolina Highway 708

In 1923, NC 708 was truncated at Bakers Crossroads, its eastern section replaced by NC 65. In 1933, NC 708 north of Ellisboro Road/Bald Hill Loop was replaced by NC 704, shrinking the route down to just . In 1935, the rest of NC 708 was replaced by NC 704, which was also realigned onto new road north of Bakers Crossroads.

North Carolina Highway 893

North Carolina Highway 893 (NC 893) was established in 1922 as a new primary route from NC 89 near Francisco, northeast to the Virginia state line. In 1923, it was renumbered as part of NC 661; today it is part of NC 704, with a small snippet to NC 8.

Junction list

See also
 North Carolina Bicycle Route 4 - Concurrent with NC 704 from Delta to NC 770

References

External links

 
 NCRoads.com: N.C. 704
 NCRoads.com: N.C. 708

Transportation in Stokes County, North Carolina
Transportation in Rockingham County, North Carolina
704